The Irian Jaya blue tongue skink (Tiliqua sp.) is one of the least understood species of blue-tongued skink. The Irian Jaya has yet to be scientifically classified, but is arguably a different species from the other recognized members of the genus.

Etymology 
Scientists have not properly categorized this animal yet.

Taxonomy 
The Irian Jaya has a distinct pattern that can be described as one of the most beautiful among blue-tongued skinks. It consists of thick dark brown, sometimes black, stripes with a peachy gold to brown undertone. The bellies of these animals can range from creme to orange to even red. As is characteristic of the other species in the genus, the Irian Jaya has a large blue tongue that it displays defensively in times of distress or danger. The approximate full length of an adult is 15-30 inches.

Life span 
The skink can live for 15-30 years.

Breeding 
The breeding season occurs once yearly. When a male finds a receptive female, he will scent mark her and follow her around. Mating can be aggressive and the males will hold the female down by biting her sides. Damage to the scales and light bleeding are common. Blue-tongued skinks are generally solitary animals and usually only come together during breeding season.

Irian Jayas are ovoviviparous. Their gestation period is roughly 100 days with 5 to 15 babies born per litter. The babies look almost exactly the same as the adults with only slight variations to coloring. The babies will wander off on their own and begin eating small insects and fruits just a few days after birth.

If kept as pets, Irian Jaya skinks should be housed separately and any offspring should be monitored for overall health during their first few sheds.  Only after weeks of healthy growth and feeding should they be considered suitable for sale or trade.

Diet 
All blue-tongued skink species are opportunistic omnivores. In the wild, they feed on carrion, small invertebrates (especially snails), and greens that have been trampled to the ground.

In captivity
Adults' diets should be 40% protein, 50% greens and vegetables, and 10% fruit, and they should be fed 1-3 times a week. Babies on the other hand should be feed every day and having their feedings gradually reduced to about 2-3 times week after the skink reaches about a year old or about 1/3 of its potential length.

References

External links 
The Irian Jaya Blue Tongue Skink at bluetongueskinks.net
Blue Tongue Skink (Irian Jaya) Care Sheets

Reptiles of Western New Guinea
Undescribed vertebrate species
Tiliqua
Skinks of New Guinea
https://www.tiliqua-time.com a care website and reference point for all Indonesian blue tongue skink sub-species